Francisco Maldonado (1480 in Salamanca – 24 April 1521) was a leader of the rebel Comuneros from Salamanca in the Revolt of the Comuneros. He was captured at the Battle of Villalar, and beheaded the following day.

1480 births
1521 deaths
People from Salamanca
People of the Revolt of the Comuneros
Spanish rebels